Dzhokhar Musayevich Dudayev (15 February 1944 – 21 April 1996) was the first President of the Chechen Republic of Ichkeria, a breakaway region in the North Caucasus, from 1991 until his assassination in 1996.

Early life and military career

Dudayev was born in Yalkhoroy from the Tsechoy teip in the Checheno-Ingush Autonomous Soviet Socialist Republic (ASSR), just a few days before the forced deportation of his family together with the entire Chechen population on the orders of Joseph Stalin. He was the thirteenth youngest child of veterinarian Musa and Rabiat Dudayev. He spent the first 13 years of his life in internal exile in the Kazakh Soviet Socialist Republic. His family was only able to return to Chechnya in 1957. Following the 1957 repatriation of the Chechens, he studied at evening school in Checheno-Ingushetia and qualified as an electrician. In 1962, after two years studying electronics in Vladikavkaz, he entered the Tambov Higher Military Aviation School for Pilots from which he graduated in 1966. Dudayev joined the Communist Party of the Soviet Union in 1968 and from 1971 to 1974 studied at the prestigious Gagarin Air Force Academy. He married Alla, a Russian poet and the daughter of a Soviet officer, with whom he had three children (a daughter and two sons).

In 1962, Dudayev began serving in the Soviet Air Force where he rose to the rank of Major-General, becoming its first Chechen general. Dudayev served in a strategic bombing unit of the Soviet Air Force in Siberia and Ukraine. He participated in the Soviet–Afghan War against the Mujahideen, for which he was awarded the Order of the Red Star and the Order of the Red Banner. Reportedly from 1986 to 1987, Dudayev had participated in bombing raids in western Afghanistan. Many of his military and political opponents who questioned his Muslim faith often made reference to his actions against the Mujahideen forces. For example, Sergei Stepashin asserted Dudayev participated in carpet bombing (a statement probably motivated by spite). These allegations were denied by Dudayev himself. Dudayev rose steadily in the Air Force, assuming command of the 326th Heavy Bomber Aviation Division of the Soviet Long Range Aviation at Tartu, Estonia, in 1987 gaining the rank of Major-General. From 1987 through March 1990, he commanded nuclear-armed long-range strategic bombers during his post there.

He was also commander of the garrison of Tartu. He learned Estonian and showed great tolerance for Estonian nationalism when in autumn 1990 he ignored the orders (as commander of the garrison of Tartu) to shut down the Estonian television and parliament. In 1990, his air division was withdrawn from Estonia and Dudayev resigned from the Soviet military.

Chechen politics
In May 1990, Dudayev returned to Grozny, the Chechen capital, to devote himself to local politics. He was elected head of the Executive Committee of the unofficial opposition All-National Congress of the Chechen People (NCChP), which advocated sovereignty for Chechnya as a separate republic of the Soviet Union (the Chechen-Ingush ASSR had the status of an autonomous republic of the Russian Soviet Federative Socialist Republic).

In August 1991, Doku Zavgayev, the Communist leader of the Chechen-Ingush ASSR, did not publicly condemn the August 1991 attempted coup d'état against Soviet President Mikhail Gorbachev. Following the failure of the putsch, the Soviet Union began to disintegrate rapidly as the constituent republics took moves to leave the beleaguered Soviet Union. Taking advantage of the Soviet Union's implosion, Dudayev and his supporters acted against the Zavgayev administration. On 6 September 1991, the militants of the NCChP violently (the Grozny Communist party leader was killed and several other members were wounded) invaded a session of the local Supreme Soviet, effectively dissolving the government of the Chechen-Ingush ASSR. Grozny television station and other key government buildings were also taken over.

President of the Chechen Republic of Ichkeria
After a referendum in October 1991 confirmed Dudayev in his new position as president of the Chechen Republic of Ichkeria, he unilaterally declared the republic's sovereignty and its independence from the Soviet Union. In November 1991, the then Russian President Boris Yeltsin dispatched troops to Grozny, but they were withdrawn when Dudayev's forces prevented them from leaving the airport. Russia refused to recognize the republic's independence, but hesitated to use further force against the separatists. From this point, the Checheno-Ingush Republic had become a de facto independent state.

Initially, Dudayev's government held diplomatic relations with Georgia where he received much moral support from the first Georgian President Zviad Gamsakhurdia. When Gamsakhurdia was overthrown in late 1991, he was given asylum in Chechnya and attended Dudayev's inauguration as President. While he resided in Grozny he also helped to organise the first "All-Caucasian Conference" which was attended by independentist groups from across the region. Ichkeria never received diplomatic recognition from any internationally recognised state other than Georgia in 1991.

The Chechen-Ingush Republic split in two in June 1992, amidst the increasing Ossetian-Ingush conflict. After Chechnya had announced its initial declaration of sovereignty in 1991, its former entity Ingushetia opted to join the Russian Federation as a federal subject (Republic of Ingushetia). The remaining rump state of Ichkeria (Chechnya) declared full independence in 1993. That same year the Russian language stopped being taught in Chechen schools and it was also announced that the Chechen language would start to be written using the Latin alphabet (with some additional special Chechen characters) rather than Cyrillic in use since the 1930s. The state also began to print its own money and stamps. One of Dudayev's first decrees gave every man the right to bear arms.

Dudayev's inexperienced and poorly-guided economic policies soon began to undermine Chechnya's economy and, Russian observers claimed, transformed the region into a criminal paradise. The non-Chechen population of Ichkeria left the republic due to criminal elements and faced with indifferent government. In 1993, the Chechen parliament attempted to organize a referendum on public confidence in Dudayev on the grounds that he had failed to consolidate Chechnya's independence. He retaliated by dissolving parliament and other organs of power. Beginning in early summer of 1994, armed Chechen opposition groups with Russian military and financial backing tried repeatedly but without success to depose Dudayev by force.

First Chechen War

On 1 December 1994, the Russians began bombing Grozny airport and destroyed some former Soviet training aircraft taken away by the republic in 1991. In response Ichkeria declared war on Russia and mobilised its armed forces. On 11 December 1994, five days after Dudayev and Minister of Defense Pavel Grachev of Russia had agreed to avoid the further use of force, Russian troops invaded Chechnya. It was mistakenly reported that one of Dudayev's two sons was killed in action early in the war; both of them were alive as of 2009.

Before the fall of Grozny, Dudayev abandoned the presidential palace, moved south with his forces and continued leading the war throughout 1995, reportedly from a missile silo close to the historic Chechen capital of Vedeno. He continued to insist that his forces would prevail after the conventional warfare had finished, and the Chechen guerrilla fighters continued to operate across the entire republic.

Assassination
On 21 April 1996, while using a satellite phone, Dudayev was assassinated by two laser-guided missiles, after his location was detected by a Russian reconnaissance aircraft, which intercepted his phone call. At the time, Dudayev was reportedly talking to a liberal deputy of the Duma in Moscow, supposedly Konstantin Borovoy. Additional aircraft were dispatched (a Su-24MR and a Su-25) to locate Dudayev and fire a guided missile. Exact details of this operation were never released by the Russian government. Russian reconnaissance planes in the area had been monitoring satellite communications for quite some time trying to match Dudayev's voice signature to the existing samples of his speech. It was claimed Dudayev was killed by a combination of an airstrike and a booby trap. He was 52 years old.

The death of Dudayev was announced on the interrupted television broadcast by Shamil Basayev, the Chechen guerrilla commander. Dudayev was succeeded by his Vice-President Zelimkhan Yandarbiyev (as acting President) and then, after the 1997 popular elections, by his wartime Chief of Staff, Aslan Maskhadov.

Dzhokhar Dudayev was survived by his wife, Alla, and their sons, Degi and Avlur. Vladislav Surkov, who was formerly Putin's top aide and an ideologist, is believed to have a distant relation with Dzhokhar.

Commemoration
There is a memorial plaque made of granite attached to the house on 8 Ülikooli street, Tartu, Estonia, in which Dudayev used to work. The house now hosts Hotel Barclay, and the former office of Dudayev has been converted into Dudayev's Room.

Places named in honor of Dudayev include: 

  – A street,  (General Dzhokhar Dudayev Street), in Goražde.
  – A large room in the Barclay Hotel in Tartu, once used as Dudaev's office, is now called the Dudaev Suite. Outside on the wall there is a  Dudayev's Memorial plaque.
  – There is a street in Georgian capital Tbilisi named after Dzokhar Dudayev.
  – In 1996, a street in the Latvian capital Riga was named   (Dzhokhar Dudaev Street). In the light of the upcoming Parliamentary elections in Latvia, several initiatives have been undertaken to lobby for the renaming or preserving the name of the street by pro-Russian and anti-Russian political parties respectively.
  –  (Dzhokhar Dudaev Square) in the Žvėrynas district of Vilnius. 
  – On 17 March 2005, a roundabout in the Polish capital Warsaw was named  (Roundabout Dzhokhar Dudayev).
  – In 1996, a street in Lviv was named  (Dzhokhar Dudayev Street), later followed by a street in Ivano-Frankivsk and a street in Khmelnytskyi. In the War in Donbas, that started in the spring of 2014, a pro-Ukrainian volunteer battalion was named after Dudayev, led by former Chechen General Isa Munayev. In December 2022 recently liberated (from Russian forces) Izium decided  to rename Turgenev Street to Dzhokhar Dudayev Street.

Notes

References 
 1994–1998 Encyclopædia Britannica

External link

See also 
 Russism, his description of the state ideology of the Russian Federation, which he made during the First Chechen War. Since then many scholars, publicists, politicians have built upon his concept.

1944 births
1996 deaths
Assassinated Chechen politicians
Deaths by airstrike
Chechen field commanders
Chechen guerrillas killed in action
Chechen nationalists
Chechen anti-communists
Communist Party of the Soviet Union members
People of the Chechen wars
Politicians of Ichkeria
Heads of the Chechen Republic
Soviet Air Force generals
Soviet major generals
Soviet military personnel of the Soviet–Afghan War
Leaders who took power by coup
Chechen warlords
Russian people of Chechen descent
Chechen independence activists
Heads of state of former countries
Recipients of the Order of the Red Star
Recipients of the Order of the Red Banner
North Caucasian independence activists
Estonian nationalists
Estonian anti-communists